Again (also known as Again '02) is the second studio album by K-pop group, Jewelry. It was released on July 31, 2002 on Star Empire Entertainment.

Overview
The "Again" concept featured a much more mature image from the previous one, dropping the cute image they once had with their debut, and gaining two new members, Seo In Young and Cho Min Ah. The entire album consists of R&B ballads (with an exception of four songs: 1492... (T.T;), which has a dance R&B sound and is also a cover of Atomic Kitten's song, See Ya, How Are You?, a dance-pop song which features rap vocals by Lee Ji Hyun and Park Jung Ah, One Summer Night, a pure pop song, and Cool Girl, another R&B dance song), completely opposed to the sexy R&B songs that were popular at that time. This album started the rise of popularity for Jewelry, with the two singles, Again (which is considered their first mega hit song) and Tonight being critically praised and very popular; charting high on the Korean Music Charts. These singles were performed frequently, which boosted album sales, and has guaranteed the album success. Although "How Are You?" wasn't an official single and wasn't performed at all, it became a very popular song from the album, which caused it to chart as well. Fans consider "'Again'" as one of, if not their best, albums to date.

Track listing

Promoted songs
"Again"
"Tonight"

See also
Park Jung-ah
Seo In-young
Jewelry

References

External links 
 Jewelry - Official Fan Café 
 

Contemporary R&B albums by South Korean artists
Jewelry (group) albums
2002 albums
Korean-language albums